The 1980 Wells Fargo Open was a women's tennis tournament played on indoor hard courts at the San Diego Sports Arena in San Diego, California in the United States that was part of the Colgate Series of the 1980 WTA Tour. It was the third edition of the tournament and was held from July 28 through August 3, 1980. First-seeded Tracy Austin won the singles title, her second consecutive at the event, and earned $20,000 first-prize money.

Finals

Singles
 Tracy Austin defeated  Wendy Turnbull 6–1, 6–3
 It was Austin's 8th singles title of the year and the 18th of her career.

Doubles
 Tracy Austin /  Ann Kiyomura defeated  Rosie Casals /  Wendy Turnbull 3–6, 6–4, 6–3

Prize money

References

External links
 ITF tournament edition details
 Tournmanent draws

Wells Fargo Open
Southern California Open
Wells Fargo Open
Wells Fargo Open